Pulgar is a surname. Notable people with the surname include:

Ángel Pulgar (born 1989), Venezuelan track cyclist
Edward Pulgar (born 1974), Venezuelan violinist and conductor
Erick Pulgar (born 1994), Chilean footballer
Hernando del Pulgar (1436 – c. 1492), Castilian royal secretary
Mónica Pulgar (born 1971), Spanish basketball player